Tom Thumb and Little Red Riding Hood is a 1962 Mexican fantasy adventure film directed by Roberto Rodríguez. It is a sequel to two other imported films, Little Red Riding Hood (1960) and Little Red Riding Hood and Friends (1961). The dubbed version of the film was theatrically released in United States by K. Gordon Murray in 1965. The film was also released on VHS by Something Weird Video in 2002. An uncut version of the film with English subtitles was released on DVD as Little Red Riding Hood and Tom Thumb vs. the Monsters.

Plot
The film follows the adventures of Little Red Riding Hood (Maria Gracia) and Tom Thumb (Cesáreo Quezadas) and their friends, fighting against the wicked Queen Witch (Ofelia Guilmáin) and her band of monsters. The film starts at the meeting of the evil monsters in the castle in the Haunted Forest, heart of the Devil's dominion, during which the Vampire (Quintín Bulnes) accuses the big bad wolf (Manuel Valdés) and the ogre (José Elías Moreno) of betraying the Queen Witch (La Reina Bruja, renamed the Queen of Badness in the English dub), who orders them to be executed. Their friend Stinky the Skunk (Santanón) escapes, however, and informs Little Red Riding Hood and Tom Thumb, who promise to help. Meanwhile, the Queen and her sister the Old Witch cast a terrible curse, turning villagers into monkeys and mice for trying to defy her magic. The rest of the story details the heroes' quest to conquer evil.

References

External links

1962 films
1960s adventure films
Mexican children's films
Mexican fantasy adventure films
1960s musical films
1960s Spanish-language films
Films based on Tom Thumb
Films based on Little Red Riding Hood
1960s English-language films
1960s Mexican films